Hoffman Crossing is an unincorporated community in eastern Washington Township, Clay County, Indiana. It is part of the Terre Haute Metropolitan Statistical Area.

History
The name honors the Hoffman family, who established the grain elevator at a railroad crossing.

Geography

References

Unincorporated communities in Clay County, Indiana
Unincorporated communities in Indiana
Terre Haute metropolitan area